The National Pig Association is the trade association for the pig industry in the UK.

History
It was formed in October 1999 from the British Pig Association commercial committee and the NFU pig committee.

British pig industry
The British pig industry has faced economic hardship. In 2007 the NPA calculated that British farmers lose £26 for every pig they produce, when there was a large increase in the cost of animal feed. This led to the BPA contributing to a campaign song entitled Stand By Your Ham, a remake of the country music song Stand by Your Man, under the banner of Pigs are worth it. This was at a time when there was estimated to be 1,500 pig farmers in the UK who received around £1.10 per kilogram of pork.

In 2011, the NPA calculated that on average British pig farmers were losing £21 per pig they produce. In total British pig farmers are losing £4 million per week, with processors of pig meat making £8 million a week, and pig meat retailers making £16 million a week.

Structure
It is based in Stoneleigh Park, the site of the NFU. Its members represent 70% of the British pig industry.

Function
NPA is the representative trade association for the British pig industry. It works closely with the industry's monthly trade journal Pig World

See also
 British Pig Association - maintains a register of the pig breeds in the UK

References

External links

 NPA
 Love Pork
 Pigs Are Still Worth It
 Pig Farm Equipments
 British Pig & Poultry Fair

Video clips
 NPA Downing Street rally in March 2011
 Pig and Poultry Fair 2008
 Stand By Your Ham by Pig Aid in February 2008

News items
 Straw shortage in June 2011
 Stand By Your Ham in February 2008
 Pork imports in November 2006
 Swine Fever in August 2000
 Pig herds in January 2000
 Pig industry in November 1999

Pig farming
Agricultural organisations based in the United Kingdom
Agricultural marketing organizations
Organisations based in Warwickshire
Organizations established in 1999
Agricultural marketing in the United States
1999 establishments in the United Kingdom